The British Overseas Territory of Gibraltar has introduced the postal code GX11 1AA. This is pending the introduction of a postcode system similar to that used in the United Kingdom. This has been under consideration by the Government of Gibraltar since 2006. The postcode is not required for local mail.

Postal districts
The Royal Gibraltar Post Office has divided the territory into fourteen postal zones known as 'walks' or 'districts', each with a number or letter as well as a name, but these are for internal use and not encountered in addresses. They are separate from the Major Residential Areas, used for statistical purposes.

References

Gibraltar
Postal system of Gibraltar
Postal codes
Gibraltar